Mohamed Farsi (born 16 December 1999) is a Canadian professional soccer player who currently plays as a right-back for Major League Soccer club Columbus Crew.

Early life
Farsi was born and raised in Montreal, Quebec, to Algerian parents from Oran. He began playing soccer at age eight with local club CS Boucaniers. He later played youth soccer for Notre-Dame-de-Grâce and CS Panellinios, eventually playing at the senior amateur level in the LSEQ with Panellinios's senior team.

Club career

Semi-pro
In 2018, Farsi signed with Première Ligue de soccer du Québec side Longueuil, making thirteen league appearances that season.

In 2019, Farsi switched to defending PLSQ champions Blainville, making nine league appearances and two appearances in the Canadian Championship against Canadian Premier League side York9.

Aïn M'lila
In 2019, Farsi signed his first professional contract with Algerian Ligue Professionnelle 1 side AS Aïn M'lila. He left after the season, without making an appearance.

Cavalry FC
On 15 April 2020, Farsi signed with Canadian Premier League side Cavalry FC, after impressing during a trial. He made his debut as a substitute in Cavalry's first game of the 2020 Canadian Premier League season, a 2–2 draw with Forge FC. Farsi would excel during the 2020 season, earning praise for his offensive and defensive efforts, and would be named for the league's U-21 player of the year. He was awarded the El Jimador Shot of the Year, for his goal against Pacific FC on September 9, 2020. In November 2020, Farsi would re-sign with the club for the 2021 season. After the 2021 season, Cavalry announced that Farsi would leave the club in order to pursue a contract in Europe or Major League Soccer.

Columbus Crew
In March 2022, Columbus Crew 2 of MLS Next Pro announced they had signed Farsi ahead of their inaugural season. He made his debut in the club's first match against Inter Miami CF II on March 26. On June 18, he signed a short-term loan with the Columbus Crew first team in Major League Soccer for their match against Charlotte FC, in which he appeared as a substitute. At the end of the season, he was named to the MLS Next Pro Best XI.

In July 2022, he signed a first team contract with the Columbus Crew.

International career
Before starting his professional career, Farsi was a prominent member of the Canadian futsal team, winning the Canadian Futsal Player of the Year award for 2020. He would go on to be involved in the 2020 Olympic football qualifiers with the Canada under-23s after initially being named a back up to the team.

Style of play 
A "modern-day full-back", Farsi is a quick, dynamic, and technically sound player, who is able to contribute both defensively and offensively, and is a player who is not only able to operate on the right as a wing-back, or winger, but can also operate centrally as a defender or midfielder. Very attack-minded, Farsi is a chance creator who moves very aggressively upfield and can put crosses in dangerous attacking areas.

Personal life 
Farsi speaks English, French, and Arabic. Growing up, he participated in soccer, futsal, as well as taekwondo. He is a fan of Lionel Messi, FC Barcelona and Manchester City.

Career statistics

Honours

Individual
 Canadian Premier League Under 21 Canadian Player of the Year: 2020

References

External links

1999 births
Living people
Association football defenders
Canadian soccer players
Soccer players from Montreal
Canadian people of Algerian descent
Sportspeople of Algerian descent
AS Aïn M'lila players
Cavalry FC players
Première ligue de soccer du Québec players
Canadian Premier League players
CS Longueuil players
Columbus Crew players
Columbus Crew 2 players
Major League Soccer players
MLS Next Pro players